The Jász-Nagykun-Szolnok County constituency no. 8 was one of the single member constituencies of the National Assembly, the national legislature of Hungary. The district was established in 1990, when the National Assembly was re-established with the end of the communist dictatorship. It was abolished in 2011.

Members
The constituency was first represented by János Szabó of the Hungarian Democratic Forum (MDF) from 1990 to 1994. In the 1994 election, János Kasuba of Hungarian Socialist Party (MSZP) was elected representative. In 1998 elelction Mihály Varga was elected of the Fidesz and served until 2014.

Election result

1990 election

References

Jasz-Nagykun-Szolnok 8th